The 1954 Tennessee gubernatorial election was held on November 2, 1954. Incumbent Democrat Frank G. Clement defeated Independent John Randolph Neal Jr. with 87.20% of the vote.

Primary elections
Primary elections were held on August 5, 1954.

Democratic primary

Candidates
Frank G. Clement, incumbent Governor
Gordon Browning, former Governor
Raulston Schoolfield

Results

General election

Candidates
Major party candidates
Frank G. Clement, Democratic
W.E. Michel, Republican 

Other candidates
John Randolph Neal Jr., Independent

Results

References

1954
Tennessee
Gubernatorial
November 1954 events in the United States